Coteland's School Ruskington was a secondary-level community school in the village of Ruskington, Lincolnshire, accommodating pupils aged 11–16 through years 7 to 11. It formally opened as Ruskington Secondary Modern School in 1957, although teaching had begun the previous year. It federated with St George's College of Technology in nearby Sleaford in 2007, and then closed at the end of 2009 to allow the schools to merge into St George's Academy. The buildings and grounds were significantly redeveloped in 2012–15 to serve as a satellite school for the academy.

History
The Education Act 1944 made secondary education available to all children up to the age of 15; a 'tripartite system' of secondary schools was established to provide curricula based on aptitude and ability: grammar schools for "academic" pupils, secondary moderns for practical studies, and technical schools for science and engineering. Pupils were allocated to them depending on their score in the eleven-plus examination. In 1947, Kesteven County Council outlined its 15-year plan for secondary education, which included the construction of a new secondary modern school at Ruskington. The buildings were completed in the 1950s and teaching commenced at Ruskington Secondary Modern School in 1956; the buildings were officially opened by Sir John Wolfenden, Vice-Chancellor of the University of Reading, the following year. Built on a  site at a cost of £100,658, the new school buildings consisted of a three-storeys of classrooms and a gymnasium, assembly/dining hall, library and greenhouse. The buildings were built around a prefabricated steel frame and modular concrete blocks clad in brick. Much of the site was devoted to playing fields, which were supplemented by eight grass tennis courts and playground. The first headmaster was George Morris Butler (died 2004), who served until 1976.

In 1993, Coteland's was threatened with closure due to declining rolls, as parents began sending children to other schools; it was operating at half capacity, with 170 pupils on roll. David Veal took over as head-teacher in 1994 and later recalled that there was "a stigma attached to the school", which he suggested contributed to pupils lacking self-esteem and becoming demotivated, a matter compounded by the eleven-plus exam which primary school leavers sat. Budget restrictions had also reduced the number of staff. According to The Independent, Ruskington was then a village of about 6,000 people, "many working in local food-processing factories, in agriculture or in nearby RAF bases on lowish incomes", and "very few professional families" sent children to Coteland's. Many of the most academic pupils from local primary schools were instead choosing to attend the grammar schools in Sleaford after passing the eleven-plus exam; in 1994, there were only three children in the school who were classed as 'above-average' in terms of academic ability. By 1998, Coteland's was ranked the second-worst school in Britain when 2% of pupils attained five GCSEs at grades A*–C. But by 2001, this had increased to 38%, making it one of the most improved school's in the country. Veal said this was largely due to changing the "ethos ... so parents can be confident it is somewhere pupils can learn."

In 2002, Ofsted recommended that Lincolnshire County Council review schools with under 600 pupils. Two years later, the council's education officers suggested that some of these schools merge, close or federate to make them more economical. St George's College of Technology in the nearby market town of Sleaford merged with two small village schools—Lafford High School and Aveland High School—in 2005 and 2006 respectively. A plan to merge them into an Academy was announced the following year; Coteland's was allowed to opt-in. When David Veal retired as headteacher of Coteland's in 2007, the school joined the federation; with that, Paul Watson became executive head of all four schools. Following a heated meeting with parents, Watson resigned as head of Lafford in 2008, and the school closed two years later. One writer for The Times Educational Supplement pointed out the GCSE results for the smaller schools would be effectively "cancelled out" by St George's results if they merged, regardless of whether they improve. The County Council's leader, Martin Hill, commented that "It will secure first class secondary provision for both the Coteland's School and the Aveland High School".

A feasibility report indicated that Aveland was not sustainable due to falling enrolment and would have to close; instead the remaining two sites would be redeveloped with £20 million of Government funding as part of the academy conversion.  A consultation process took place in June and July 2009 and received 127 responses, 85 of which were positive. In September 2009, the County Council published a statutory notice that St George's, Coteland's and Aveland would close and a new academy would open in their place; Aveland was deemed unsustainable and would be wound down in 2011, but up to £20m could be given the new academy to refurbish the other sites. With the notice period over, the County Council decided to back the proposals on 1 December 2009. The scheme was approved by the Secretary of State for Education and, after officially closing on the last day of 2009, St George's combined with Coteland's and Aveland to become St George's Academy on 4 January 2010.

The school buildings at Ruskington were demolished in 2012 and work began on a new school as part of the academy development plans. Following extensive redevelopment, the new campus buildings were officially opened on 6 November 2015.

Structure
Coteland's School was a state-run community school serving pupils aged 11 to 16. The school was coeducational, with a capacity for 378 pupils.

References

Citations

Bibliography
 
 

Defunct schools in Lincolnshire